Gary Y. Okihiro is an American author and scholar. Currently at Yale, he was a professor of international and public affairs at Columbia University in New York City and the founding director of Columbia's Center for the Study of Ethnicity and Race. Okihiro received his Ph.D. from the University of California, Los Angeles in 1976.

Career
Prior to Yale and Columbia, Okihiro was the director of Asian American Studies at Cornell University. He was recruited to Columbia partially as a result of a 1996 undergraduate student protest calling for an ethnic studies department to provide counterbalance to what was perceived to be a biased pro-Western core curriculum. He received the Lifetime Achievement Award from the Association for Asian American Studies and the American Studies Association, and is a past president of the Association for Asian American Studies. In 2010, Okihiro received an honorary doctorate from the University of the Ryukyus.

Social Formation Theory
Okihiro is the originator of "social formation theory," which he defines as the forms and processes of power in society to oppress and exploit.  By forms, he means the discourses and practices of race, gender, sexuality, class, and nation, and by processes, he refers to the articulations and intersections of those social categories.  Power is agency, while oppression is the restriction of agency, and exploitation, the expropriation of land and labor.  Okihiro has also proposed a field of study that he calls "Third World studies" from the "Third World curriculum" demanded by students of the Third World Liberation Front in 1968.  Third World studies, he contends, is the correct name for the field now known as "ethnic studies."  He explains that name switch and some of its consequences in his book, "Third World Studies: Theorizing Liberation" (2016).

Writings
Okihiro is the author of twelve books, six of which have won national awards, and dozens of articles on historical methodology and theories of social and historical formations, and the history of racism and racial formation in the U.S., African pre-colonial economic history, and race and world history.  Among his books are: 
Cane Fires: The Anti-Japanese Movement in Hawaii, 1865-1945; 
Margins and Mainstreams: Asians in American History and Culture; 
(with Joan Myers) Whispered Silences: Japanese Americans and World War II; 
(with Linda Gordon) Impounded: Dorothea Lange And the Censored Images of Japanese American Internment; 
Common Ground: Reimagining American History; 
The Columbia Guide to Asian American History; 
Island World: A History of Hawai`i and the United States ;  
Pineapple Culture: A History of the Tropical and Temperate Zones.
"American History Unbound: Asians and Pacific Islanders".
"Third World Studies: Theorizing Liberation".

He has also written on African history, including A Social History of the Bakwena and Peoples of the Kalahari of Southern Africa, 19th Century.

References

External links
 Personal site
 Columbia University faculty page
 "On Comparative Ethnic Studies" by Gary Okihiro, Columbia Daily Spectator, Feb. 20, 2004
 "College students renew demands for ethnic studies programs" by Alethea Yip, AsianWeek, May 10, 1996
 Gary Okihiro Papers at the Rare Book and Manuscript Library, Columbia University, New York, NY
 with Gary Okihiro by Stephen McKiernan, Binghamton University Libraries Center for the Study of the 1960s, November 2010

American writers of Japanese descent
Columbia University faculty
Cornell University faculty
Yale University faculty
American academics of Japanese descent
Living people
Year of birth missing (living people)